This is a list of films produced in the United Kingdom in 1960 (see 1960 in film):

1960

See also
1960 in British music
1960 in British radio
1960 in British television
1960 in the United Kingdom

References

External links

1960
Films
Lists of 1960 films by country or language